Şilavar (also, Şiləvar, Shilavar, and Shilyavar) is a village and municipality in the Lankaran Rayon of Azerbaijan.  It has a population of 2,285.

References 

Populated places in Lankaran District